Kadyrovo (Qäźer) is a rural locality (a selo) and the administrative centre of Kadyrovsky Selsoviet, Ilishevsky District, Bashkortostan, Russia. The population was 754 as of 2010. There are 12 streets.

Geography 
Kadyrovo is located 23 km southwest of Verkhneyarkeyevo (the district's administrative centre) by road. Kyzyl-Kuch is the nearest rural locality.

References 

Rural localities in Ilishevsky District